The 2008–09 CERH European League was the 44th edition of the CERH European League organized by CERH. Its Final Eight was held in May 2009 in Bassano del Grappa, Italy.

Group stage
In each group, teams played against each other home-and-away in a home-and-away round-robin format.

The group winners and runners-up advanced to the final eight.

Group A

Group B

Group C

Group D

Final eight
The final eight was played at PalaBassano, in Bassano del Grappa, Italy.

Reus Deportiu finally conquered its seventh title, 37 years after their last win.

Bracket

References

External links
 CERH website

2008 in roller hockey
2009 in roller hockey
Rink Hockey Euroleague